This is a list of awards and nominations received by South Korean model, singer, and actress Park Shin Hye.

Awards and nominations

State honors

Rankings

Notes

References

Park Shin-hye